The Metropolitanate of Singapore and South Asia is an Eastern Orthodox diocese of the Ecumenical Patriarchate of Constantinople. It is centered in Singapore and has jurisdiction over Eastern Orthodox Christians in several countries of South Asia and Southeast Asia, including: Singapore, Indonesia, Malaysia, Brunei, East Timor, Maldives, Sri Lanka, Bangladesh, India, Nepal, Bhutan, Pakistan and Afghanistan. It was founded in January 2008 by the decision of the Holy Synod of the Ecumenical Patriarchate of Constantinople.

History

Until 2008, the Ecumenical Patriarchate of Constantinople had one Diocese in the regions of South and Southeastern Asia, created in November 1996 as Orthodox Metropolitanate of Hong Kong and Southeast Asia, with jurisdiction over: Hong Kong, Macao, China, Taiwan, Mongolia, Philippines, Vietnam, Cambodia, Laos, Thailand, Myanmar, and also Singapore, Indonesia, Malaysia, Brunei, Timor, Maldives, Sri Lanka, Bangladesh, India, Nepal, Bhutan, Pakistan and Afghanistan. 

On January 9, 2008, the Holy Synod of the Ecumenical Patriarchate decided to divide the huge area of the Metropolitanate of Hong Kong, by creating a new Eastern Orthodox Metropolitanate of Singapore and South Asia, with jurisdiction over Singapore, Indonesia, Malaysia, Brunei, Timor, Maldives, Sri Lanka, Bangladesh, India, Nepal, Bhutan, Pakistan and Afghanistan. After three years of administration, the first Diocesan Bishop was appointed. On November 3rd, 2011, the Holy Synod of the Ecumenical Patriarchate elected Archmandrite Konstantinos (Tsilis) as the first Metropolitan of Singapore and South Asia. He was ordained on November 21st by Ecumenical Patriarch Bartholomew I of Constantinople.

The Metropolitanate is divided into vicariates and parishes. The central parish in Singapore is served by Archmandrite Daniel Toyne. Father Chrysostomos Manalu is the archepiscopal vicar for Indonesia and Father John Tanveer is the only priest in Pakistan.

See also
 Christianity in Singapore
 Indonesia Orthodox Church
 Eastern Orthodox Church

References

Bibliography

External links
 Official Site of the Eastern Orthodox Metropolitanate of Singapore and South Asia
 Official Site of the Eastern Orthodox Metropolitanate of Hong Kong and Southeast Asia

Singapore
Eastern Orthodoxy in Singapore
Churches in Singapore
Eastern Orthodoxy in Indonesia
Eastern Orthodox dioceses in Asia